Antonio Guillermo "Tony" Succar (born 18 May 1986), is a Peruvian-American percussionist, composer, arranger, bandleader, and producer.

Early life
Succar was born in Lima, Peru. When he was two years old his family emigrated to the United States and settled in Miami, Florida. Among his relatives were a number of musicians who encouraged Succar to develop his own musical interests. The family's musical tradition began with his paternal great-grandparents, Mexican composer Lauro D. Uranga and Spanish flamenco dancer Adelina Esteve Gregory. Succar's father Antonio F. Succar is a Peruvian pianist and his mother Mimy Succar Tayrako Sakaguchi is a Peruvian-American singer of Japanese descent.  Since he was 3 years old Tony started playing the Peruvian cajón. When Succar was 13, he began playing drums with his parents' band when they performed at weddings and other private and corporate functions, mainly in Miami.

Education
Succar attended Miami Sunset Senior High School in Miami-Dade County. At the time his ambition was to be a professional soccer player, and he played in several teams, including his high school team when it won the 2004 state championships. Later he tried to earn a soccer scholarship at Florida International University. Unable to obtain a scholarship, he asked his father for study advice. The advice he got was to apply for FIU's School of Music. Seeking an interview with the school's drum instructor he ended up auditioning for the Latin Jazz ensemble and was quickly accepted. Succar gained a Bachelor of Arts in Jazz Performance in 2008 and went on to study for a master's degree, which he gained in 2010.

Musical career
Succar already had an active musical career while still an undergraduate student. As a college junior he took over as musical director of the family band, which he rebranded as Mixtura.

On 21 September 2010, Succar released an album recorded at his graduate recital, a live concert featuring Mixtura at Miami's Wertheim Performing Arts Center. This CD/DVD contains a mix of Latin-influenced arrangements of classic Jazz numbers and original material. It received numerous positive reviews including Audiophile Audition and JazzChicago.

After graduating from FIU, Succar became an artist-in-residence there in 2012, continuing to work with the school's music students on a number of projects. He is the youngest artist ever to hold this appointment at FIU.

Succar has worked with a number of prominent artists in the Latin music genres. These include Tito Nieves, La India, Kevin Ceballo, Michael Stuart, Jon Secada, Jennifer Peña, Jean Rodríguez and Obie Bermúdez, who all collaborated with him on Unity: The Latin Tribute to Michael Jackson.

In 2019, Succar was nominated for a Latin Grammy Award in four separate categories, winning for Best Salsa Album and as Producer of the Year.

The Unity Project
Unity: The Latin Tribute to Michael Jackson is a collaborative project to produce a musical tribute to Michael Jackson. As well as live performances, the project plans to release an album consisting of 14 Jackson songs rewritten to include Latin influences, primarily salsa. and Latin American Ritmos, Succar, who was a long-term fan of Jackson's work, is the founder and producer of the project.
Unity was launched in 2015 with a concert at Olympia theater in Miami Sponsored and transmitted by PBS TV, 360 Stations, and also Sponsored by Universal Music Classic. Unity features more than 100 musicians, such Latin superstars as Tito Nieves, Jon Secada, La India, Obie Bermudez, Jennifer Pena, Michael Stuward, Angel Lopez, Sheila E., Judith Hill, Jean Rodríguez, Fernando Vargas, Maribel Diaz, Kevin Ceballo, Presented in PBS TV by Gloria Estefan, mixed by engineer Bruce Swedien.

References

1986 births
American male musicians
American salsa musicians
Latin Grammy Award winners
Living people
Peruvian emigrants to the United States
Peruvian people of Japanese descent
Latin Grammy Award for Producer of the Year
American people of Japanese descent
American musicians of Japanese descent
Latin music record producers
Latin music songwriters